Luís José Junqueira Freire (December 31, 1832 – June 24, 1855) was a Brazilian poet and Benedictine monk, adept of the "Ultra-Romanticism" movement and author of Inspirações do Claustro. He is the patron of the 25th chair of the Brazilian Academy of Letters.

Biography
Luís José Junqueira Freire was born December 31, 1832, in Salvador, Bahia, to José Vicente de Sá Freire and Felicidade Augusta Junqueira. After completing his primary studies and Latin, he was matriculated at the Liceu Provincial of Salvador in 1849. Two years later, he joined the Order of Saint Benedict by family reasons. Although unsatisfacted living at the monastery, there he could write and read poetry, and served as a teacher.

He demanded his secularity in 1853, and, one year later, having obtained it, he refugiated at home, where he wrote his short Autobiography. Shortly before dying, on June 24, 1855, due to heart problems he had since his childhood, Freire published the poetry anthology he wrote during his years at the Benedictines' monastery, called Inspirações do Claustro (in ). The poems of it speak mostly of the solitude Freire suffered at the monastery, and also another subjects, such as celibacy horror; repressed desires who disturbed him and increased in him the wish to sin; the Brazilian nationalism; revolts against rules, the world and himself; obsession by death, and the mal du siècle.

Some of Freire's poems have slight Abolitionist traits; because of that, some critics consider him a forerunner of the Condorism.

He was among the first poets in Brazil to write homoerotic verses.

Works
 Autobiografia (Autobiography — 1854)
 Inspirações do Claustro (Cloister Inspirations — 1855)

External links
 Inspirações do Claustro online 
 Junqueira Freire's biography at the official site of the Brazilian Academy of Letters

References

19th-century LGBT people
1832 births
1855 deaths
Romantic poets
Brazilian autobiographers
Portuguese-language writers
People from Bahia
Brazilian male poets
Patrons of the Brazilian Academy of Letters
19th-century Brazilian poets
19th-century Brazilian male writers
Brazilian LGBT poets